The Gorakhpur–Yesvantpur Express is an Express train belonging to North Eastern Railway zone that runs between  and  via  in India. It is currently being operated with 15023/15024 train numbers on a weekly basis.

Service

The 15023/Gorakhpur– Yesvantpur Express has an average speed of 49 km/hr and covers 2464 km in 50h 30m. The 15024/Yesvantpur–Gorakhpur Express has an average speed of 56 km/hr and covers 2464 km in 43h 50m.

Route & Halts 

The important halts of the train are:

Coach composition

The train has standard LHB rakes with max speed of 130 kmph. The train consists of 22 coaches:

 3 AC II Tier
 6 AC III Tier
 7 Sleeper Coaches
 4 General Unreserved
 2 End-on Generator

ENG-GEN-UNZ-UNZ-SLR-SLR-SLR-AC2-AC2-AC2-AC3-AC3-AC3-AC3-AC3-AC3-SLR-SLR-SLR-UNZ-UNZ-

GEN

Traction

Both trains are hauled by a Jhansi-based WDM-3A or WDP-4D diesel locomotive from Gorakhpur to Jhansi. From Jhansi, the trains are hauled by a Lallaguda-based WAP-7 electric locomotive until Kacheguda. From Kacheguda, the trains are hauled by a Kazipet-based twin WDM-3A diesel locomotive until Yesvantpur and vice versa.

See also 

 Yesvantpur Junction railway station
 Gorakhpur Junction railway station
 Gorakhpur–Yesvantpur Express (via Gonda)
 Gorakhpur–Yesvantpur Express

Notes

References

External links 

 15023/Gorakhpur–Yesvantpur Express (via Faizabad)
 15024/Yesvantpur–Gorakhpur Express (via Faizabad)

Transport in Bangalore
Express trains in India
Passenger trains originating from Gorakhpur
Rail transport in Madhya Pradesh
Rail transport in Maharashtra
Rail transport in Telangana
Rail transport in Andhra Pradesh
Rail transport in Karnataka